Gervasoni is an Italian surname from the Lombardia region of Italy and the Ticino canton of Switzerland.

People with this surname include:

 Dr Ann Gervasoni, Australian educator
 Carlo Gervasoni (b. 1982), Italian football defender. 
 Jack Gervasoni (1929-1992), Australian footballer and mayor
 Stefano Gervasoni (b. 1962), Italian composer.
 Pablo Gervasoni (b. 1971), Argentinian Gestalt Terapist, actor and director In Spain, Barcelona

Italian-language surnames